August Karl Eduard Kiss, or Kiß (October 11, 1802 – March 24, 1865) was a German sculptor, known for his monumental bronzes.

Life and works
Kiss was born in Paprotzan (now Paprocany, part of Tychy in Poland) in Prussian Silesia. He studied at the Prussian Academy of Arts under Christian Rauch, Christian Friedrich Tieck, and Karl Friedrich Schinkel.  His work was mostly executed in the Neo-Classical style and consisted largely of portraits and mythological and allegorical subjects. He died in Berlin.

Kiss was responsible for two monuments in Breslau: On the west part of the Ring, stood a bronze equestrian statue of Frederick The Great (1842), and another equestrian statue of Prussian King Frederick Wilhelm III (1862).

In 1889 the Fairmount Park Art Association (now the Association for Public Art) obtained a plaster of one of Kiss' best known works, The Amazon and in 1929 the work was cast in bronze and now stands in front of the Philadelphia Museum of Art.

Selected sculptures

External links

 

1802 births
1865 deaths
19th-century German sculptors
German male sculptors
Architectural sculptors
People from Tychy
People from the Province of Silesia
Prussian Academy of Arts alumni
19th-century German male artists